The 1937–38 Akron Goodyear Wingfoots season was the Wingfoots' inaugural year in the United States' National Basketball League (NBL), which was also the first year the league existed. Thirteen teams competed in the NBL, comprising six teams in the Eastern Division (Akron Goodyear's division) and seven teams in the Western Division. The Wingfoots were one of two teams from Akron, Ohio in the league, the other being the Akron Firestone Non-Skids.

The Wingfoots played their home games at Goodyear Hall. They finished the season with a 13–5 record, placing second in the Eastern Division. However, they went on the win the league's playoffs championship against the Western Division's Oshkosh All-Stars, two games to one in a best-of-three series.

Head coach Lefty Byers won the league's first Coach of the Year Award, while players Chuck Bloedorn and Charley Shipp earned First Team All-NBL honors.

Roster

 

Note: Leroy Lins and Ray Morstadt were not on the playoffs roster.

Regular season

Season standings

Playoffs

Eastern Division Semifinals
(E2) Akron Goodyear Wingfoots vs. (E1) Akron Firestone Non-Skids: Wingfoots win series 2–0
Game 1 @ Wingfoots: Wingfoots 26, Non-Skids 21
Game 2 @ Non-Skids: Wingfoots 37, Non-Skids 31

NBL Championship
(E2) Akron Goodyear Wingfoots vs. (W1) Oshkosh All-Stars: Wingfoots win series 2–1
Game 1 @ Oshkosh: Akron 29, Oshkosh 28
Game 2 @ Akron: Oshkosh 39, Akron 31
Game 3 @ Akron: Akron 35, Oshkosh 27

Awards and honors
 NBL Coach of the Year – Lefty Byers
 First Team All-NBL – Chuck Bloedorn and Charley Shipp

References

Akron Goodyear Wingfoots seasons
Akron Goodyear
National Basketball League (United States) championship seasons
Akron Goodyear Wingfoots
Akron Goodyear Wingfoots